This is a list of noted South African poets, poets born or raised in South Africa, whether living there or overseas, and writing in one of the South African languages.

A-C
Lionel Abrahams
Tatamkulu Afrika
Mike Alfred
Ingrid Andersen
Gabeba Baderoon
Shabbir Banoobhai
Sinclair Beiles
Robert Berold
Vonani Bila
Roy Blumenthal
Herman Charles Bosman
Breyten Breytenbach
André Brink
Dennis Brutus
Guy Butler
Roy Campbell
Charl Cilliers
Johnny Clegg
Jack Cope
Jeremy Cronin
Patrick Cullinan
Gary Cummiskey
Sheila Cussons

D-G
Achmat Dangor
Ingrid de Kok
Phillippa Yaa de Villiers
Modikwe Dikobe
Isobel Dixon
Angifi Dladla
Finuala Dowling
I D du Plessis
Koos du Plessis
Elisabeth Eybers
Kingsley Fairbridge
Gus Ferguson
Sheila Meiring Fugard
Keith Gottschalk
Stephen Gray
Mafika Gwala

H-M
Megan Hall
Joan Hambidge
Colleen Higgs
Christopher Hope
Peter Horn
Allan Kolski Horwitz
Alan James
Wopko Jensma
Liesl Jobson
Sarah Johnson
Ingrid Jonker
Aryan Kaganof
Anne Kellas
Keorapetse Kgositsile
Olga Kirsch
Koos Kombuis
Rustum Kozain
Uys Krige
Antjie Krog
Anton Krueger
Mazisi Kunene
Cornelis Jacobus Langenhoven
C. Louis Leipoldt
Douglas Livingstone
Lindiwe Mabuza
Don Maclennan
Mzi Mahola
Lucas Malan
Eugene Marais
Andrew Martens
Lebogang Mashile
John Mateer
Don Mattera
James Matthews
Mzwakhe Mbuli
Kim McClenaghan
Michelle McGrane
Sheila Meiring Fugard
Joan Metelerkamp
Ruth Miller
Amitabh Mitra
Natalia Molebatsi
Kobus Moolman
Isabella Motadinyane
Seitlhamo Motsapi
Casey Motsisi
S.E.K. Mqhayi
Oswald Mtshali

N-S
Arthur Nortje
D. J. Opperman
William Plomer
Karen Press
Thomas Pringle
N.S. Puleng
Lesego Rampolokeng
Azila Talit Reisenberger
Robert Royston
Gerard Rudolf
Arja Salafranca
Sipho Sepamla
Mongane Wally Serote
Steve Shapiro
Ari Sitas
Douglas Reid Skinner
Adam Small

T-Z
Totius
Ernst van Heerden
Christopher van Wyk
Benedict Wallet Vilakazi
A.G. Visser
Wayne Visser
Gert Vlok Nel
Crystal Warren
Stephen Watson
Mary Morison Webster
George Weideman
Athol Williams
David Wright
Makhosazana Xaba

See also

 List of poets
 List of South African writers
 South African literature
 South African poetry

 
South African
Poets